The 2020 Turkish Basketball Cup was the 35th edition of Turkey's top-tier level professional national domestic basketball cup competition. The quarter-finals of tournament was held from 11–12 February 2020 in 4 different locations and then semi-finals and the final were held from 14–16 February 2020 in the Ankara Arena in Ankara, Turkey.

Qualified teams 
The top eight placed teams after the first half of the top-tier level Basketball Super League 2019–20 season qualified for the tournament. The four highest placed teams are going to play the lowest seeded teams in the quarter-finals. The competition was played under a single elimination format.

Draw
The 2020 Turkish Basketball Cup was drawn on 27 January 2020. The seeded teams were paired in the quarterfinals with the non-seeded teams.

Bracket

Quarterfinals

Semifinals

Final

See also
2019–20 Basketbol Süper Ligi

References

Turkish Cup Basketball seasons
Cup